Ismail Sahardiid was a Somali military official. He was the overall commander of the TFG government forces in the southern Jubaland region, having led SNA forces during the Battle of Kismayo (2012). After further command changes, he replaced Brig Gen Sid Abdulle and took command again at the end of July 2016.

References

Somalian military leaders
Living people
Somalian generals
Year of birth missing (living people)